Zlonín is a municipality and village in Prague-East District in the Central Bohemian Region of the Czech Republic. It has about 1,100 inhabitants. As of 2022, with an average age of 30.3 years, the municipality has the youngest population in the country.

History
The first written mention of Zlonín is from 1367.

References

External links

Villages in Prague-East District